Jahrom International Airport  is an airport in Jahrom, Fars Province, Iran. It was established in 1969.

Currently, it hosts three regular flights per week from and to the capital city of Tehran on Saturdays, Mondays and Wednesdays.

The flight from Jahrom to Tehran takes around two hours.

Airlines and destinations

References

A
Airports in Iran
Fars Province
Jahrom County
Buildings and structures in Jahrom
Transportation in Fars Province